Reszki may refer to the following places:
Reszki, Masovian Voivodeship (east-central Poland)
Reszki, Podlaskie Voivodeship (north-east Poland)
Reszki, Pomeranian Voivodeship (north Poland)
Reszki, Warmian-Masurian Voivodeship (north Poland)